"It's Alright" is the last single from Ricky Martin's album Life. The Spanish version is called "Déjate Llevar" ("Indulge"). The single was released on March 7, 2006.

The original version of "It's Alright" contains Ricky Martin vocals only. In 2006, M. Pokora recorded additional vocals in French, and this new version was released as a single in Francophone countries. It was later included on the special edition of M. Pokora's Player album. It was one of the last songs written by singer-songwriter Soraya who died of a relapse of breast cancer later in 2006.

Chart performance
"Déjate Llevar" peaked at number twenty-one on the Hot Latin Songs in the United States.

The solo version of "It's Alright" reached number seventeen in Finland and number sixty-nine on the Dutch Single Top 100.

The duet version of "It's Alright" with M. Pokora peaked at number four on the French Singles Chart and achieved Silver status for more than 111,200 copies sold. It reached also number eleven in Belgium Wallonia and number eighteen in Switzerland.

Music video
Shot in New York City and in Puerto Rico by Liquid Films, the videos for the English and Spanish versions were directed by Simon Brand and produced by Betinna Abascal, Robert Feliciano and Robert Perkins. Maz Makhani was the director of photography. The videos aired in February 2006.

The Ricky Martin featuring M. Pokora live music video, directed by Gérard Pullicino, aired in April 2006.

Formats and track listings
European CD single
"It's Alright" – 3:31
"Dejate Llevar" (It's Alright – Spanish) – 3:34

French CD maxi-single
"It's Alright" (Duet with M. Pokora) (Radio Edit) – 3:22
"It's Alright" (Album Version) – 3:31
"María" (Spanglish Extended Remix) – 7:56

Charts and certifications

Weekly charts

Year-end charts

Certifications and sales

References

2006 singles
Ricky Martin songs
M. Pokora songs
Macaronic songs
Music videos directed by Simon Brand
Songs written by Soraya (musician)
Songs written by George Pajon
2005 songs
Columbia Records singles